Girvan is a surname. Notable people with the surname include:

Hector Girvan (1899–1969), Scottish footballer
Michelle Girvan (born 1977), American physicist and network scientist
Paul Girvan (born 1963), Northern Irish politician
Richard Girvan (born 1973), New Zealand international lawn bowler

See also
Girvan, a settlement in Scotland